The 1961–62 season was the 38th season in the existence of AEK Athens F.C. and the third consecutive season in the top flight of Greek football. They competed in the Alpha Ethniki and the Greek Cup. The season began on 9 September 1961 and finished on 17 June 1962.

Overview

In the summer of 1961, AEK Athens aspired to return to the championship claim. With Tryfon Tzanetis on the wheel of the team and Kleanthis Maropoulos essentially in the position of technical director, they carried out the transfers of Panikos Krystallis and Dimitris Zagylos from Cyprus, who were considered very skilled footballers.

AEK started strongly in the league with three consecutive wins including the emphatic 8–0 away win against Egaleo, which is the biggest away win at first national division level, while in the 4th matchday they drew 0–0 with Olympiacos in Nea Filadelfeia, though were better than their opponent. In the 6th matchday, AEK were at the top of the standings alongside Panathinaikos and Olympiacos, where they remained until the 8th matchday when without conceding a single goal, they faced Panathinaikos at Leoforos Alexandras Stadium. AEK found themselves losing by 2–0 and they managed to reduce the score to 2–1, however in the last quarter of the match they collapsed resulting in a 4–1 defeat while the "greens" were able to extend the score even more. Thus, AEK moved into second place, however they continued to have good performances. However, they was also defeated by Apollon Athens, which at that time had a formidable team and was in the first positions of the standings. With various ups and downs, they remained with 5 points from the top until the 28th matchday, when the derby against Panathinaikos took place. In a packed Nea Filadelfeia Stadium, AEK entered strongly and by half an hour into the game they were leading 2–0. Shortly before the end of the half, Panathinaikos was reduced the score to 2-1 and during the second half achieved the comeback by winning 2–3, which mainly happened due to mistakes by the players of AEK. They continued, aiming for the second place with Olympiakos and Apollon as their main competitors, with the latter defeating them at home and passed them in the standings and at the end of the championship AEK finished in 4th place.

In the round of 32, AEK awarded the match against Kalamata, as they resigned from the game. In the round of 16, they faced Apollon Athens at home in the presence of fifteen thousant spectators and AEK were defeated 2–1 and were eliminated. It was the third time in the same year that Apollon won AEK, as they had already won two times in the championship.

Players

Squad information

NOTE: The players are the ones that have been announced by the AEK Athens' press release. No edits should be made unless a player arrival or exit is announced. Updated 30 June 1962, 23:59 UTC+2.

Transfers

In

Out

Overall transfer activity

Expenditure:  ₯2,220,000

Income:  ₯0

Net Total:  ₯2,220,000

Pre-season and friendlies

Alpha Ethniki

League table

Results summary

Results by Matchday

Fixtures

Greek Cup

Matches

Statistics

Squad statistics

! colspan="9" style="background:#FFDE00; text-align:center" | Goalkeepers
|-

! colspan="9" style="background:#FFDE00; color:black; text-align:center;"| Defenders
|-

! colspan="9" style="background:#FFDE00; color:black; text-align:center;"| Midfielders
|-

! colspan="9" style="background:#FFDE00; color:black; text-align:center;"| Forwards
|-

|}

Disciplinary record

|-
! colspan="14" style="background:#FFDE00; text-align:center" | Goalkeepers

|-
! colspan="14" style="background:#FFDE00; color:black; text-align:center;"| Defenders

|-
! colspan="14" style="background:#FFDE00; color:black; text-align:center;"| Midfielders

|-
! colspan="14" style="background:#FFDE00; color:black; text-align:center;"| Forwards

|-
|}

References

External links
AEK Athens F.C. Official Website

AEK Athens F.C. seasons
AEK Athens